Kalinovka is a rural locality (a village) in Kazangulovsky Selsoviet, Davlekanovsky District, Bashkortostan, Russia. The population was 42 as of 2010. There are 2 streets.

Geography 
Kalinovka is located 12 km northeast of Davlekanovo (the district's administrative centre) by road. Ismagilovo is the nearest rural locality.

References 

Rural localities in Davlekanovsky District